Nadon is a surname found mostly in Canada.

People
Alex Nadon, Canadian Lighting designer
Guy Nadon (born in 1952), French-Canadian actor
Joseph-Célestin Nadon (1899-1953), Canadian politician
Marc Nadon (born in 1949), Canadian judge
Maurice Nadon (1920-2009), Canadian Royal Canadian Mounted Police commissioners

See also
Amélie Goulet-Nadon (born in 1983), Canadian short track speed skating
Arnaud Gascon-Nadon (born in 1988), Canadian football defensive lineman
RCMP vessel Nadon, vessel of the Royal Canadian Mounted Police's Marine Division

Surnames
French-language surnames